The Renault TRM 10000 is a truck used by the French armed forces since 1987. It is utilized both as a troop transport and logistics vehicle.

History 
Production of the TRM 10000 began in 1985. It was developed from the TRM 9000, which was a 9-ton truck designated for export. The TRM 10000 has a longer wheelbase, a revised transmission and a more powerful engine.

After an initial order of 178 vehicles, a second order for 759 trucks was placed in 1987. Originally scheduled for a production of 5,000 trucks, only about 1,000 trucks were produced.

Characteristics 
The TRM has a six-cylinder diesel engine, the MIDR 06.20.45 and has a 6x6 drive for use on roads, trails and off-road.

References 

Military vehicles introduced in the 1980s
TRM10000
Military trucks of France
Off-road vehicles